Kosy Knook Court is a bungalow court located at 830 Brooks Avenue in Pasadena, California. The court was constructed in 1922 and designed by G. W. Tombleson. The court includes five identical homes arranged around a central path; it originally included two garages as well, which have since been removed. The homes were designed in the Colonial Revival style and feature entrance porticos, windows with multiple panes, wood siding, and jerkinhead roofs.

The court was added to the National Register of Historic Places on November 15, 1994.

References

Bungalow courts
Houses in Pasadena, California
Houses completed in 1922
Houses on the National Register of Historic Places in California
National Register of Historic Places in Pasadena, California
Colonial Revival architecture in California
Historic districts on the National Register of Historic Places in California